Ban Khon railway station is a railway station located in Ban Khon Subdistrict, Phichai District, Uttaradit. It is located 437.410 km from Bangkok railway station and is a class 3 railway station. It is on the Northern Line of the State Railway of Thailand.

Train services
 Local 403 Phitsanulok-Sila At
 Local 407/408 Nakhon Sawan-Chiang Mai-Nakhon Sawan
 Local 410 Sila At-Phitsanulok

References 
 Ichirō, Kakizaki (2010). Ōkoku no tetsuro: tai tetsudō no rekishi. Kyōto: Kyōtodaigakugakujutsushuppankai. 
 Otohiro, Watanabe (2013). Tai kokutetsu yonsenkiro no tabi: shasō fūkei kanzen kiroku. Tōkyō: Bungeisha. 

Railway stations in Thailand